Pink Flag is the debut studio album by English rock band Wire. It was released in November 1977 by Harvest Records. The album gained Wire a cult following within independent and post-punk music upon its initial release, later growing to be highly influential on many other musicians.

Critical reception

Reviewing in 1978 for The Village Voice, Robert Christgau called Pink Flag a "punk suite", praised its "simultaneous rawness and detachment" and detected a rock-and-roll irony similar to, but "much grimmer and more frightening" than, the Ramones. In a 1978 Trouser Press review, Ira Robbins said that "Wire [push] minimalism to new heights" and said the band "dredges up images of...beat poetry--short fragments of impressions set to music." Robbins said that the 21 tracks are "not songs...There's no easy structure or meter. Each explores or describes or electrifies or challenges. There's no easy listening." He concluded, "I can't say this is an enjoyable album. Maybe it's just a stupid bit of rubbish. But you won't know unless you find out."

In a retrospective review, Steve Huey of AllMusic opined that Pink Flag was "perhaps the most original debut album to come out of the first wave of British punk" and also "recognizable, yet simultaneously quite unlike anything that preceded it. Pink Flags enduring influence pops up in hardcore, post-punk, alternative rock, and even Britpop, and it still remains a fresh, invigorating listen today: a fascinating, highly inventive rethinking of punk rock and its freedom to make up your own rules." Retrospectively, Trouser Press called the album "a brilliant 21-song suite" in which the band "manipulated classic rock song structure by condensing them into brief, intense explosions of attitude and energy, coming up with a collection of unforgettable tunes". Pitchfork writer Joe Tangari summarized the album as "a fractured snapshot of punk alternately collapsing in on itself and exploding into song-fragment shrapnel."

Legacy
Although the album was released to critical acclaim, it was not a big seller. It was listed at number 412 on Rolling Stones list of The 500 Greatest Albums of All Time in 2012 – jumping up to number 310 in its 2020 edition – and at number 378 in NMEs list of the same name in 2013. Music journalist Stuart Maconie described it as "extraordinary" by the standards of the time at which it was produced. Pitchfork ranked Pink Flag number 22 in its list "Top 100 Albums of the 1970s". The album was included in Robert Dimery's 1001 Albums You Must Hear Before You Die.

Britpop band Elastica were influenced by Wire; they used a riff similar to that of "Three Girl Rhumba" for their song "Connection". Graham Coxon of Blur cited Pink Flag as an influence on his eighth studio album A+E.

 Track listing 
Credits adapted from the 2018 Special Edition.

All music written by Colin Newman, except where noted. All lyrics written by Graham Lewis, except where noted.* The bonus tracks were removed from the 2006 remastered reissues, because, according to the band, they did not honour the "conceptual clarity of the original statements". The tracks were also left off both editions of Pink Flags 2018 remaster, but can be found on the 2018 deluxe reissue of Chairs Missing.

 2018 Special Edition 
The first disc of the Special Edition contains the twenty-one tracks from the original album.

Personnel
Credits adapted from the liner notes of the 2018 Special Edition.Wire Bruce Gilbert – guitar, sleeve concept
 Robert Gotobed – drums 
 Graham Lewis – bass guitar, backing vocals, sleeve concept
 Colin Newman – vocals, guitar, backing vocalsAdditional personnel and production'
 Kate Lukas – flute on "Strange" 
 Dave Oberlé – backing vocals on "Mannequin"
 Mike Thorne – production, piano on "Reuters", backing vocals on "Reuters" and "Mr. Suit", flute arrangement on "Strange", electric piano on "Options R"    
 Paul Hardiman – engineer
 Ken Thomas – assistant engineer
 David Dragon – art direction
 Annette Green – front and back cover photography
 Richard Bray – back cover photography
 Lynda House – back cover photography
 Tim Chacksfield – project co-ordination (1994 reissue)
 Phil Smee – packaging (1994 reissue)
 Denis Blackham – remastering (2006 and 2018 reissue)
 Jon Wozencroft – art direction (2018 reissue)
 Jon Savage – liner notes (2018 reissue)
 Graham Duff – liner notes (2018 reissue)

References

Informational notes

External links 
 
 
 
 

1977 debut albums
Harvest Records albums
Restless Records albums
Wire (band) albums
Albums produced by Mike Thorne